Cefmenoxime is a third-generation cephalosporin antibiotic.

References

External links
 
 
 
 

Acetaldehyde dehydrogenase inhibitors
Thiazoles
Tetrazoles
Cephalosporin antibiotics
Ketoximes